Method is a 2004 thriller film directed by Duncan Roy. The international co-production is a film within a film about a cast and crew who are in Romania to make a film about serial killer, Belle Gunness.

Plot
During filming the lead actress (Elizabeth Hurley), tries to get deeply into character since the film is very important to her career. She may go too far when incidents on the set begin to pattern themselves after the real-life story.

Cast
Elizabeth Hurley as Rebecca
Jeremy Sisto as Jake Fields
Oliver Tobias as Teddy
Carmen du Sautoy as Mother (Mona)
John Barrowman as Timothy Stevens
Sam Douglas as Mr. Hinkley
Hannah Yelland as Bethany Fields

Production

The film later generated headlines over the public falling out between leading lady, Hurley and the director, Roy. Roy claimed Hurley was difficult to work with. Hurley's spokesman denied the claims and cited that Hurley had earlier even recommended Roy as director of the project. Oliver Tobias, a co-star on the production, rebuffed Roy's claims, remarking that he had a pleasant working experience with Hurley, who was “a lady” and a “consummate professional”.

References

External links
 

2004 films
2000s horror thriller films
2000s serial killer films
Romanian horror thriller films
English-language Romanian films
Swiss horror thriller films
Films set in Romania
Films shot in Romania
Films about filmmaking
American serial killer films
Films produced by Donald Kushner
2000s English-language films
2000s American films